() is a trans-Neptunian object, approximately  in diameter, on a highly eccentric orbit in the outermost region of the Solar System. It was discovered by astronomers at the Chilean Cerro Tololo Inter-American Observatory on 29 July 2000.

Description 
At aphelion it is over 1,000 AU from the Sun and, with a perihelion of 21 AU, almost crosses the orbit of Uranus at closest approach. Astronomers with the Deep Ecliptic Survey classify it as a centaur rather than a trans-Neptunian object.  came to perihelion in April 2005.

Comparison

See also 
 
 
 
 
 TAU (spacecraft) (probe designed to go 1000 AU in 50 years)
List of Solar System objects by greatest aphelion

References

External links 
 List Of Centaurs and Scattered-Disk Objects at the Minor Planet Center
 
 

Scattered disc and detached objects
Centaurs (small Solar System bodies)
Discoveries by CTIO
Discoveries by the Deep Ecliptic Survey
20000729